"Knots and Crosses" is a 2007 episode of STV's
Rebus television series. It was the fourth episode broadcast in the show's fourth season, and stars Ken Stott in the title role. 
The episode takes its name from the Ian Rankin novel of the same name, although this is where the similarity ends. Knots and Crosses was the first Rebus novel, however the episode bearing its name was the last to be broadcast.

Plot 
When the case for murder against Daniel Carr, a drug dealer, collapses, Rebus is held responsible by Davis Haigh, the prosecutor, and by Brian Robertson, another dealer whose son was killed by Carr. Rebus comes under investigation by Clive Dawson, a former friend, and Trish Fuller, an ambitious DS. Rebus and Clarke reopen the murder case, which is complicated when Carr and his brother are found dead. 
The Knots and Crosses of the title are the anonymous notes received by Clarke at various times during the investigation, of a cross of crudely tied sticks.

Cast 
Ken Stott as DI John Rebus
Claire Price as DS Siobhan Clarke
Brian McCardie as Brian Robertson  
Nicholas Farrell as Davis Haigh  
Kevin McMonagle as Clive Dawson 
Susan Vidler as Trish Fuller
Sam Heughan as Peter Carr

Footnotes

External links 

2007 British television episodes
Rebus (TV series) episodes